Conjeevaram Srirangachari Seshadri  (29 February 1932 – 17 July 2020) was an Indian mathematician. He was the founder and director-emeritus of the Chennai Mathematical Institute, and is known for his work in algebraic geometry. The Seshadri constant is named after him. He was also known for his collaboration with mathematician M. S. Narasimhan, for their proof of the Narasimhan–Seshadri theorem which proved the necessary conditions for stable vector bundles on a Riemann surface.

He was a recipient of the Padma Bhushan in 2009, the third highest civilian honor in the country.

Degrees and posts

Seshadri was born into a Hindu Brahmin family in Kanchipuram, Tamil Nadu. He received his B.A. (Hons) degree in mathematics from Madras University in 1953 and was mentored by the Jesuit priest Fr. Charles Racine and S. Naryanan there. He completed his PhD from Bombay University in 1958 under the supervision of K. S. Chandrasekharan. He was elected Fellow of the Indian Academy of Sciences in 1971.

Seshadri worked in the School of Mathematics at the Tata Institute of Fundamental Research in Bombay from 1953 to 1984 starting as a Research Scholar and rising to a senior professor. From 1984 to 1989, he worked at the Institute of Mathematical Sciences, Chennai. From 1989 to 2010, he worked as the founding director of the Chennai Mathematical Institute. After stepping down he continued to be the institute's Director-Emeritus till his death in 2020. He also served on the Mathematical Sciences jury for the Infosys Prize in 2010 and 2011.

Visiting professorships

 University of Paris, France
 Harvard University, Cambridge
 UCLA
 Brandeis University
 University of Bonn, Bonn
 Kyoto University, Kyoto, Japan

He has given talks at the ICM.

Awards and fellowships

 Honorary degree, Université Pierre et Marie Curie (UPMC), Paris, 2013
 Honoris Causa, University of Hyderabad, India
 Padma Bhushan
 Shanti Swarup Bhatnagar Award
 Srinivasa Ramanujan Medal from the Indian Academy of Sciences
 Honorary D.Sc. from Banaras Hindu University
 TWAS Science Award
 Fellow of IAS, INSA and a Fellow of the Royal Society
 Membership of the United States National Academy of Sciences
 Fellow of the American Mathematical Society, 2012

Research work

Seshadri's main work was in algebraic geometry. His work with M S Narasimhan on unitary vector bundles and the Narasimhan–Seshadri theorem has influenced the field. His work on Geometric Invariant Theory and on Schubert varieties, in particular his introduction of standard monomial theory, is widely recognized.

Publications

Notes

References

External links

1932 births
2020 deaths
Algebraic geometers
20th-century Indian mathematicians
Harvard University staff
University of Madras alumni
University of Mumbai alumni
Recipients of the Padma Bhushan in science & engineering
Tamil scholars
Foreign associates of the National Academy of Sciences
Fellows of the American Mathematical Society
Fellows of the Royal Society
Fellows of the Indian Academy of Sciences
Tata Institute of Fundamental Research alumni
21st-century Indian mathematicians
Recipients of the Shanti Swarup Bhatnagar Award in Mathematical Science
Kanchipuram